Martins Creek is a tributary of Goose Creek in Clay County in the U.S. state of Kentucky that used to have a Martins Creek post office.

Tributaries and post offices 
Its eponymous postoffice was established on 1876-07-10 by postmasters Marshall Corum and George D. Mahan, and closed on 1878-09-20.
It was located just downstream on the Goose from the mouth of Martins.

The Wages postoffice was established on 1884-02-06 by William Wages, and closed in November 1885.
His first choice of name had actually been Martins Creek.

The Plank postoffice was established on 1906-12-07 by postmaster George W. Walker, and closed in September 1992.
It served several lumber mills and the store of J. B. Walker, and local oral history is that its name was taken from a plank of wood propped against the wall of one of the aforementioned mills, a lumbermill practice that was used to boast that it had sawn the longest plank in the area.

See also
List of rivers of Kentucky

References

Sources

Further reading 

 

Rivers of Kentucky
Rivers of Clay County, Kentucky